Rheinland-Pfalz (F225) is the fourth ship of the s of the German Navy.

Background 
Rheinland-Pfalz was designed and constructed by ARGE F125, a joint-venture of Thyssen-Krupp and Lürssen.

Construction and career
Rheinland-Pfalz was laid down on 29 January 2015 and launched on 24 May 2017 in Hamburg. She was delivered to the German Navy in January 2022 and commissioned into service on 13 July of that year.

Gallery

References

External links 
 Seaforces.org

Baden-Württemberg-class frigates
2017 ships
Ships built in Hamburg